Karen Holdsworth (née Moody, also Goldhawk, 2 August 1960 –  30 April 2013) was a British marathon runner, who won the 1983 Berlin Marathon.

Career
Holdsworth was a member of South Shields athletics club. In 1981, Holdsworth won the inaugural Great North Run, finishing in a time of 1:17.36. In the same year, she finished sixth at the inaugural London Marathon, in a time of 2:43:28. In 1983, she won the Berlin Marathon in a time of 2:40:32. In the same year, she won the Paris Marathon. In 1984, she won the Reading and Fleet Half Marathons.

Marathon competition record 

Source:

References

External links
 World Athletics

1960 births
2013 deaths
British female marathon runners
Berlin Marathon female winners
20th-century British women